Flight Sergeant Jeffrey James Grieve (27 January 1918 – 8 November 1944) was an Australian rules footballer who played with South Melbourne in the Victorian Football League (VFL).

Originally from McKinnon, Grieve made 11 appearances for South Melbourne, which all came in the 1941 VFL season.

He was a second cousin of Carlton player Ollie Grieve.

Military
Grieve, who worked as a baker, enlisted in the Royal Australian Air Force in 1942. On 8 November 1944, Grieve was one of seven men on board a bomber (Halifax LK901), which crashed during a cross-country training exercise. The plane took off from Sandtoft, Lincolnshire and broke up mid air after going into cumulonimbus clouds due to atmospheric icing. The plane's remains crashed into the ground near Glenshee, Scotland, killing all 7 crew members on board.

See also 
 List of Victorian Football League players who died on active service

References

External links

1918 births
Sydney Swans players
Australian rules footballers from Melbourne
Royal Australian Air Force personnel of World War II
Australian military personnel killed in World War II
Victims of aviation accidents or incidents in Scotland
1944 deaths
People from Armadale, Victoria
Military personnel from Melbourne